Marek Hollý (born 20 August 1973) is a former Slovak professional footballer.

Club career
He started his career at SK Sigma Olomouc in the Czech Gambrinus liga, where he made 80 appearances over the course of 4 seasons, scoring a total of 3 goals. He made his debut in the Russian Premier League in 1999 for FC Lokomotiv Nizhny Novgorod.

Honours
 Russian Premier League bronze: 1999.
 Russian Cup finalist: 2000 (played in the early stages of the 1999–00 tournament for PFC CSKA Moscow).

European club competitions
With PFC CSKA Moscow.

 UEFA Champions League 1999–2000 qualification: 2 games.
 UEFA Cup 2000–01: 1 game.

References

1973 births
Living people
Slovak footballers
Slovak expatriate footballers
Czech First League players
SK Sigma Olomouc players
ŠK Slovan Bratislava players
FC Lokomotiv Nizhny Novgorod players
PFC CSKA Moscow players
FC Spartak Vladikavkaz players
FC Anzhi Makhachkala players
Russian Premier League players
FC Volgar Astrakhan players
Slovak Super Liga players
Slovak expatriate sportspeople in Russia
Expatriate footballers in Russia
Slovakia international footballers
Association football midfielders
Sportspeople from Martin, Slovakia